Syrie ('Syria') was a French language daily newspaper published from Beirut, Lebanon. The newspaper was founded in 1917. As of 1937, its director was Georges Vassié.

Syrie was an official organ of the French High Commission. Therefore, it had a pro-French stance.

References

1917 establishments in the Ottoman Empire
Defunct newspapers published in Lebanon
French-language newspapers published in Lebanon
Newspapers published in Beirut
Publications established in 1917
Publications with year of disestablishment missing
Daily newspapers published in Lebanon